Liene Bērziņa (born Liene Zostiņa 27 September 1984 in Smiltene) is a Latvian television and radio personality. She appeared in the show Zvaigžņu lietus.

References

People from Smiltene
1984 births
Living people
Latvian television personalities